"How It's Got to Be" is a song by German recording artist Jeanette. Built around Russian composer Pyotr Ilyich Tchaikovsky's "Act 2, Scene 10: Moderato" from his ballet Swan Lake (1875–76), it was written by Biedermann and Kristina Bach and produced by Cobra for her second studio album Delicious (2001). Released as the album's first single, it peaked at number seven on the German Singles Chart, reaching gold status. In addition, it peaked at number 22 in Austria and Switzerland, respectively.

Formats and track listings

Charts

Weekly charts

Year-end charts

Certifications and sales

References

2001 songs
Jeanette Biedermann songs
Universal Music Group singles
Songs written by Jeanette Biedermann
Songs written by Kristina Bach